Autumn Smithers (born November 4, 1997) is an American professional soccer player who last played as a defender for National Women's Soccer League (NWSL) club Portland Thorns FC.

Club career

Portland Thorns FC
Smithers made her NWSL debut in the 2020 NWSL Challenge Cup on July 1, 2020.

References

External links
 San Francisco profile
 Notre Dame profile

Living people
American women's soccer players
Soccer players from California
Sportspeople from Modesto, California
Women's association football defenders
San Francisco Dons women's soccer players
Notre Dame Fighting Irish women's soccer players
Portland Thorns FC players
National Women's Soccer League players
1997 births